Diaxenes dendrobii is a species of beetle in the family Cerambycidae. It was discovered and described by Gahan in 1894.

References

Apomecynini
Beetles described in 1894